The thirteenth government of Israel was formed by Levi Eshkol on 12 January 1966, following the November 1965 elections. His coalition included the Alignment (an alliance of Mapai and Ahdut HaAvoda), the National Religious Party, Mapam, the Independent Liberals, Poalei Agudat Yisrael, Progress and Development and Cooperation and Brotherhood, and had eighteen ministers.

On 5 June 1967, the first day of the Six-Day War, Gahal and Rafi joined the government, with the number of ministers rising to 21. Eshkol died on 26 February 1969, and the government was temporarily led by Yigal Allon until Golda Meir formed the fourteenth government on 17 March 1969.

New posts in the government included the Minister of Immigrant Absorption and the Minister of Information.

Cabinet members

¹ Kol was elected to the Knesset on the Independent Liberal list, but resigned his seat after being appointed to the cabinet.

2 Although Barzilai or Bentov were not MKs at the time, both were members of Mapam.

3 Although Shapira was not an MK at the time, he had previously been an MK for Mapai, and w elected to the next Knesset as a member of the Alignment.

References

External links
The thirteenth government of Israel Knesset website

 13
1966 establishments in Israel
1969 disestablishments in Israel
Cabinets established in 1966
Cabinets disestablished in 1969
1966 in Israeli politics
1967 in Israeli politics
1968 in Israeli politics
1969 in Israeli politics
 13